Zinc picolinate (or ZnPic) is the zinc salt of picolinic acid which has the molecular formula Zn(C6H4O2N)2.

Zinc picolinate has been used as a dietary zinc supplement.

References 

Dietary supplements
Picolinates
Zinc compounds